La Fragosa or Fragosa is a village and alqueria located in the municipality of Nuñomoral, in Cáceres province, Extremadura, Spain. As of 2020, it has a population of 138.

Geography 
La Fragosa is located 184km north of Cáceres, Spain.

References

Populated places in the Province of Cáceres